Bulbophyllum umbellatum (umbrella bulbophyllum) is a species of orchid. It is native to tropical parts of South East Asia.

References

External links 
 

umbellatum